William Wallace "Bill" Blanton (March 11, 1924 - April 4, 2014) was an American politician and businessman.

Born in Shawnee Mission, Kansas, Blanton and his family moved to Carrollton, Texas, where his father ran a mill. During World War II, Blanton served as a pilot in the United States Army Air Forces. Blanton and his wife owned Schlotzsky Sandwiches Shops. Blanton served on the Carrollton-Farmers Branch school board. From 1977 to 1987, Blanton served as a Republican in the Texas House of Representatives. His brother Jack C.F. Blanton also served in the Texas Legislature. Blanton died in Carrollton, Texas.

Notes

1924 births
2014 deaths
People from Johnson County, Kansas
People from Carrollton, Texas
Businesspeople from Texas
United States Army Air Forces pilots of World War II
Republican Party members of the Texas House of Representatives
20th-century American businesspeople
Military personnel from Texas